Sir Richard Atkins, 2nd Baronet (1654–1696), of Clapham, Surrey and Tickford, Buckinghamshire, was an English politician.

He was an MP for Buckinghamshire in the period 1695 – 28 November 1696 and a baronet.

References

1654 births
1696 deaths
People from Clapham
People from Buckinghamshire
Baronets in the Baronetage of England
English MPs 1695–1698